The School Bag is a 2017 short film directed by Dheeraj Jindal starring Rasika Duggal and Sartaj RK.
The film has been screened at more than 100 film festival across 24 countries and won 44 awards in different categories. The film was applauded by critics as well public after its online release on Large Short Films.

The short film is based on a real life incident of 2014, happened in Peshawar Pakistan when 132 innocent kids were killed in Army Public School by terrorists  Rasika Duggal who plays the mother who would do anything to bring a smile on her child's face it tells a story about the relationship between a mother and her seven-year-old son who wants a new school bag on his birthday, but fate has something else in store for him.

Cast 
 Rasika Duggal
 Sartaj RK

Reception 
The film has been selected and won many international awards

 Vancouver Film Festival 
 Fastnet Film Festival Winner 
 Reel to real International film festival 
 Best Short Film at Sandpoint Film Festival in USA 
 Smita Patil International Film Festival
 GIIFFA 
 Haryana International Short Film Festival 
 Bengal International Short Film Festival 
 Lahore International Children's Film Festival 
 Indian Film Festival of Cincinnati 
 Free Spirit Film Festival

References

External links 
 

2017 films
2010s Hindi-language films
Films about terrorism in India